Telugu Raithu is the farmers' wing of the Telugu Desam Party.

Former presidents
Nallamala Venkateswara Rao (2014)

References 

Telugu Desam Party
Year of establishment missing